The 1997–98 National Soccer League season, was the 22nd season of the National Soccer League in Australia.

Overview
It was contested by 14 teams, and South Melbourne won the championship. First year Carlton SC competed.

Regular season

League table

Finals series

Bracket

Marconi Fairfield 1-0 : 1-0 Sydney United
Wollongong Wolves 3-0 : 2-2 Adelaide City
Marconi Fairfield 2-1 Wollongong Wolves
Carlton 1-2 : 0-1 South Melbourne
Carlton 1-0 Marconi Fairfield

Grand Final

References
Australia - List of final tables (RSSSF)

National Soccer League (Australia) seasons
1998 in Australian soccer
1997 in Australian soccer
Aus
Aus